The Sial tribe (also written as Siyal, Syal, Sayal, Seyal) is a  Jatt tribe in the Punjab region of the Indian subcontinent, split between India and Pakistan.

Ethnographic classification 
Denzil Ibbetson, an administrator of the British Raj, classified the Sial as Rajput tribe.

Following the introduction of the Punjab Land Alienation Act in 1900, the authorities of the Raj classified the Sials who inhabited the Punjab as an "agricultural tribe", a term that was administratively synonymous with the "martial race" classification that was used for the purposes of determining the suitability of a person as a recruit to the British Indian Army.

History 
During the fifteenth- and sixteenth centuries, during the period of the Mughal empire, the Sial and Kharal tribes were dominant in parts of the lower Bari and Rachna doabs of Punjab. The 1809 Treaty of Amritsar, agreed between Ranjit Singh, the Sikh leader, and the British, gave him a carte blanche to consolidate territorial gains north of the Sutlej river at the expense both of other Sikh chiefs and their peers among the other dominant communities. In 1816, the Sial chief of Jhang, in Rachna doab, was ousted, having previously been forced to pay tribute to Singh for several years. The Sials in Jhang, as in many other areas of the Punjab, had once been nomadic pastoralists. They did not necessary cultivate all of the land that they controlled and it was the actions of the Sikh empire and, later, the land reforms of the Raj administration that caused them to turn to cultivation.

Popular culture 
The Heer Ranjha and Mirza Sahiban, epic poems of Punjabi literature are pieces of fictional writing which refer to the Sials, who were the dominant tribe at the time. The two heroines, Heer is depicted as young and independent-minded daughter of a Sial chieftain in revolt against traditional tribal conservatism. Heer is portrayed as a Sial Jatt while Sahiban is also from a Jatt family.

Notable people with this surname
 Muhammad Arif Khan Rajbana Sial, former federal and provincial minister
 Amit Sial, an Indian actor working in Hindi cinema

References 

Rajput clans of Punjab
Punjabi-language surnames
Social groups of Punjab, India
Punjabi tribes
Social groups of Punjab, Pakistan
Pakistani names
Hindu surnames
Indian surnames